Woman in the Dark is a 1952 American crime film directed by George Blair and written by Albert DeMond. The film stars Penny Edwards, Ross Elliott, Rick Vallin, Richard Benedict, Argentina Brunetti and Martin Garralaga. The film was released on November 15, 1952, by Republic Pictures.

Plot
At their parents' 40th-anniversary celebration are the Morello brothers, priest Tony, lawyer Phil and wayward Gino, whose comments offend Phil's new fiancée, Evelyn. Gino wants to join gangster Nick Petzik's organization. Petzik plots a jewel heist, after which Gino's lawyer brother, who represents the insurance company, can be blackmailed into fencing the stolen gems if he doesn't want Gino implicated in the crime.

Anna Reichardt, a young woman in love with Phil, is concerned. After the robbery, and Gino's admission to Phil that he was in on it, Phil decides to turn the tables on the crooks and recover both the jewels and the insurance cash. He neglects Evelyn, who breaks off their engagement. Petzik's thugs gain revenge by shooting Gino, but just when Phil is about to be killed, too, Anna arrives with the police.

Cast     
Penny Edwards as Anna Reichardt
Ross Elliott as Father Tony Morello
Rick Vallin as Phil Morello
Richard Benedict as Gino Morello
Argentina Brunetti as 'Mama' Morello
Martin Garralaga as 'Papa' Morello
Edit Angold as Tante Maria
Peter Brocco as Nick Petzik
Barbara Billingsley as Evelyn Courtney
John Doucette as 'Dutch' Bender
Richard Irving as 'Slats' Hylan
Luther Crockett as Police Inspector Johnson
Carl Thompson as Mickey
Charles Sullivan as Chuck

References

External links 
 

1952 crime films
1952 films
American black-and-white films
American crime films
Republic Pictures films
Films directed by George Blair
1950s English-language films
1950s American films